The Bachelor Canada (season 2) is the second season of W Network reality television series The Bachelor Canada. The season premiered on September 18, 2014. This season features 28-year-old Tim Warmels, an entrepreneur from Milton, Ontario.

Contestants 
Biographical information according to City official series site, plus footnoted additions.

Call-out order 

 The contestant received a first impression rose
 The contestant received a rose during the date
 The contestant was eliminated
 The contestant was eliminated during the date
 The contestant was eliminated outside the rose ceremony
 The contestant quit the competition
 The contestant won the competition

Episodes (dates)

Week 1 
Original airdate: September 18, 2014

No dates for this week. Bachelor Tim Warmels meets the contestants. Natalie and Sachelle both receive roses before the Rose Ceremony.

First Impression Rose: Christine White

Rose Ceremony: Andrea, Jacqueline, Jennifer, Jewel, Kelsey, Raelee, Rebecca, Ritiuska, Sarah and Sharan do not receive a rose and are eliminated.

Week 2 
Original airdate: September 25, 2014

One-on-one: Kaylynn. Tim takes Kaylynn on a helicopter ride to Grouse Mountain where they enjoy dinner indoors. Kaylynn talks about her past experiences which impress Tim. They share the first kiss of the season and she receives a rose.

Group Date One: The girls are split up into two groups. Team One: Allison, Dominique, Lisa, Renee, Sachelle. Team Two: April Borgnetta, Jenny, Martha, Rileigh and Trisha. They go dragon boat racing. The winning team gets to spend extra time with Tim while the losing team must leave. Team two wins. They go to the Sun Garden for dinner. Trisha receives the date rose.

Group Date Two: Christine, Natalie, Sonia and April Brockman. Each girl has the chance to pose with Tim for a photo-shoot. Tim fails to connect with Sonia and they mutually agree it would be best for her to go home. April wins the 1-on-1 time.

Cocktail Party: Kaylynn becomes very emotional. Martha tries to cheer her up by saying she has nothing to worry about, Kaylynn takes this as an attack and breaks down.

Rose Ceremony: Renee and Allison are eliminated.

Week 3 
Original airdate: October 2, 2014
 Located in: Los Cabos

One-on-one: Lisa. Tim takes Lisa to Wild Canyon where they go on a "death swing." Later, they enjoy an outdoor dinner. Lisa receives a rose.

Group Date: Martha, Jenny, Sachelle and April Borgnetta. They watch and then perform traditional folk dancing. Sachelle wins the 1-on-1 time.

Tim cancels the second group date to spend more time with the girls. He also decides he will be sending four girls home instead of two. Some of the girls including Trisha are upset about this.

Rose Ceremony: Martha, Jenny, April Borgnetta and Christine are eliminated.

Week 4 
Original airdate: October 9, 2014
 Located in: The Bahamas

One-on-one: Natalie. Natalie and Tim enjoy a simple walk through the city. Natalie is extremely nervous and their time together is awkward. A frustrated Tim tells her he wants her to stay, but he doesn't feel confident enough to give her a rose. She decides to go home.

Group Date: April, Kaylynn, Lisa, Dominique and Sachelle. They go swimming with sharks. There is no group date rose.

Two-on-one: Trisha and Rileigh. They both spend 1-on-1 time together to talk so Tim can choose who he has the better connection with. He picks Trisha, and Rileigh is sent home. Trisha and Tim then proceed to have a dinner and play on the beach and she receives a rose.

Rose Ceremony: It comes down to Dominique and Kaylynn for the final rose, and Tim decides to keep them both for another week. Nobody is sent home.

Week 5 
Original airdate: October 14, 2014
 Located in: Toronto

One-on-one: April. They explore Toronto where Tim shows her some important places in his life and opens up a little bit about his past, she in return opens up about her past relationship. They then go play a game of pool and have dinner and she receives a rose.

Group Date: Kaylynn, Lisa, Sachelle and Trisha. They go to Canada's Wonderland where it's completely shut down just for them. They go on the rides and then go cart racing with the winner receiving alone time with Tim. Kaylynn wins.

At this point, Natalie returns and Dominique decides to send herself home before her 1-on-1 date with Tim. She warns Tim to be careful and to keep an eye on some of the girls.

Rose Ceremony: Natalie is eliminated.

Week 6 
Original airdate: October 21, 2014
 Located in: Tuscany

There are no group or date roses this week.

One-on-one: Trisha. They explore the city and enjoy an outdoor lunch. He gifts her a necklace earring set from Michael Hill Jeweller.

Before the group date, it's revealed that Lisa made out with another guy when the girls went out to a bar. Tim does not know yet, and all the girls are angry and say they will tell him if she doesn't.

Group Date: Lisa, Kaylynn and April. The girls paint a portrait of Tim. Tim picks the best painting without knowing who painted it. He chooses Lisa's picture and she wins the 1-on-1 time. Lisa tells him about the other night saying the Bartender gave her a kiss. He doesn't send her home.

One-on-one: Sachelle. They go to the Casa Buitoni where they cook and eat their own pizza. Sachelle tells Tim about the other night but it's a completely different story than what Lisa told him. Sachelle says that Lisa kept making out with the bartender even after the girls tried to get her to stop.

Rose Ceremony: Tim takes Lisa aside and she apologizes again. Kaylynn is sent home.

Week 7 
Original airdate: October 28, 2014

 Located in: Hometowns

Tim travels to the remaining four ladies hometowns to meet their families.

Trisha: Tim meets Trisha in Edmonton outside of a skating rink. She is wearing an Edmonton Oilers jersey and gives him a Maple Leafs one. They go inside the rink where it is completely empty and play a game of hockey and slow dance. Afterwards, they go to Trisha's house to meet her family. It goes over well and Tim says he feels like part of the family. After dinner when Tim leaves, Trisha admits she's falling for him, to which Tim replies, "I fell for you a long time ago."

Sachelle: They meet up in Toronto where they're supposed to take a flight together to Sachelle's hometown, but due to unforeseen weather the flight is delayed until later the day. Sachelle is upset and says the date is ruined, but Tim decides to turn it into a double hometown and show her around Toronto. They sit together on a bench discussing children and sipping coffee until it's time to leave. At Sachelle's, things take a sour turn when her brother interrogates Tim and tells him not to hurt Sachelle or drag her around any longer if he doesn't see her being the one.

April: Tim meets April on a beach in her hometown. She explains to him that she won't be meeting her mom and dad because her dad died of a drug overdose when she was eight and she doesn't have a relationship with her mother. Instead, he will be meeting her grandparents who raised her. They go to dinner at a restaurant previously owned by her grandparents. April's grandmother says she can see through Tim, but later warms up and tells him that she loves him. As they say goodbye, April admits that she's falling for Tim. Later, in a confessional, Tim admits that he's falling for April too.

Lisa: Tim meets Lisa at a park in her hometown. They go for a walk but stop at a nearby bench because Tim wants Lisa to explain again what happened in Tuscany. She says that she did tell him. He then tells her that while he can see himself falling for her, he wouldn't feel right to continue their relationship and that he can't meet her parents in good faith. She says she respects him not dragging her along. As Tim walks away, she says, "I knew it!" and smirks to the camera and says she's done.

Rose Ceremony: April is called first, then Trisha, leaving Sachelle without a rose and subsequently eliminated.

Week 8: Women Tell All 
Original Airdate: November 4, 2014

Highlights include the girls confronting Lisa and Natalie saying she knew Tim wasn't into her but returned to add drama.

Week 9: Final Part One 
Original Airdate: November 11, 2014

Week 10: Final Part Two 
Original Airdate: November 18, 2014

Notes

References

External links 

2014 Canadian television seasons
The Bachelor (franchise) seasons
Television shows filmed in Ontario
Television shows filmed in British Columbia
Television shows filmed in Mexico
Television shows filmed in the Bahamas
Television shows filmed in Italy
Television shows filmed in Edmonton
Television shows filmed in Calgary
Television shows filmed in French Polynesia